Jeff Golfman (born May 13, 1968) is a Canadian businessman, entrepreneur, inventor and author.

Background
Golfman was born on May 13, 1968, in Vancouver, British Columbia. He is a graduate of the University of Winnipeg Collegiate, and the Ivey Business School at University of Western Ontario.

Career
In 1990, Golfman started the Blue Box curbside recycling program in Winnipeg, Manitoba. In January 1998, Golfman and Woody Harrelson co-founded Prairie Paper, whose goal was to manufacture paper from wheat straw waste. The company's "Step Forward Paper" is made of 80 percent wheat straw waste and 20 percent wood fiber. In 2012, Golfman patented a method for manufacturing solely nonwood fiber paper. Golfman served as president of Prairie Paper until August 2015.

In December 2015, Golfman founded The Raw Office, a drop-ship reseller of environmentally friendly office supplies. In 2016, Golfman joined the Chlorine Free Products Association (CFPA) as an advisory board member.

Philanthropy
In 1991 Golfman founded Green Kids, Inc., a nonprofit live theatre group which helps educate young people on environmental subjects. In 2017 Golfman organized a fundraiser for Margaret's Housing and Community Support Services, raising about $177,000.

Awards and publications
In 2009, Golfman received the Silver Lining Award for Pulse Furniture. In 2013 Golfman was awarded the 3M Environmental Innovation Award by the Royal Canadian Geographical Society for his work in Prairie Paper.

In 2013 Golfman published a book, The Cool Vegetarian; he also publishes a blog by the same name. Also in 2013, Golfman was one of four Manitobans nominated for the Manning Innovation Awards.

In 2016, he was a finalist for the Brightlane Entrepreneur Awards for The Raw Office.

Golfman has also been a guest writer at Entrepreneur since 2016.

Other awards include the Federal Business Development Bank's Entrepreneur of the Year award, the Sustainable Development Award of Excellence, and the 2012 Envirokidz Giving Back Award.

References

1968 births
Living people
Businesspeople from Vancouver